A list of films produced in Spain in 1965 (see 1965 in film).

1965

External links
 Spanish films of 1965 at the Internet Movie Database

1965
Lists of 1965 films by country or language
Films